Davam Ya Tamam is the Azerbaijani version of the television gameshow Deal or No Deal. It was produced by Space TV in 2010 and Azad Azerbaijan TV from 2016 to 2017.

The Space TV series consists of 21 boxes, which ranges from 0.5 AZN (about US$0.3) and as big as 10,000 AZN (about US$5,900).

The Azad Azerbaijan TV series consists of 24 cases, containing prizes from 1 AZN (about US$0.6) to 30,000 AZN (about US$17,800).

Box/Case Values

Space TV
 
<div style="float:left; width:200px;">

Azad Azerbaijan TV

External links
Official channel in youtube (Space TV)
Official channel in youtube (Azad Azerbaijan TV)
Official site (Space TV)

Deal or No Deal
2016 Azerbaijani television series debuts
2017 Azerbaijani television series endings
2010s Azerbaijani television series